is a subprefecture of Kagoshima Prefecture, Japan. The subprefectural office is located in Nishinoomote.

It includes the following cities and towns on the Ōsumi Islands:

Kumage Subprefecture
Nishinoomote (city on Tanegashima and Mageshima)
Nakatane (town on Tanegashima)
Minamitane (town on Tanegashima)
Yakushima Office
Yakushima (town on Yakushima and Kuchinoerabujima)

History

1889: These area, formerly governed by Ōshima Subprefecture, were succeeded by Kumage and Gomu District Governments.
1897: Gomu District was merged into Kumage District.
1926: Kumage Subprefecture was founded on the corresponding area.

Offices
Kumage Subprefecture: 7590 Nishinoomote, Nishinoomote-shi, Kagoshime-ken. 891-3192
Kumage Subprefecture Yakushima Office: 650 Anbō, Yakushima-machi, Kumage-gun, Kagoshime-ken. 891-4311
Kumage Educational Office: 7590 Nishinoomote, Nishinoomote-shi, Kagoshime-ken. 891-3192

External links
 Official website
 

Subprefectures in Kagoshima Prefecture